Farmaceutisk Læreranstalt, later Danmarks Farmaceutiske Højskole) was a pharmaceutical educational institution established in 1892 in Copenhagen, Denmark. It merged with University of Copenhagen in 2007 and is now known as the School of Pharmaceutical Sciences (PharmaSchool).

History

Farmaceutisk Læreranstalt was established at the private initiative of Christian Ditlev Ammentorp Hansen. Ge acquired a site in Stockholmsgade and charged Andreas Clemmesen with the design of a building. Construction began in 1891 and the school opened in 1892.

The school relocated to Universitetsparken in 1042. Its new building was designed by Kaj Gottlob. The  dr.pharm. degree was also introduced in 1942. The lic.pharm. degree was introduced in 1945.

The name in 2003 was changed to Danmarks Farmaceutiske Universitet (DFU).

In 2007 it was merged into the University of Copenhagen as the Department of Pharmaceutical Sciences )Det Farmaceutiske Fakultet, FARMA), The Department of Pharmaceutical Sciences was merged with the Department of Health and is now known as the  School of Pharmaceutical Sciences (PharmaSchool).

References

Higher education in Copenhagen
1892 establishments
2007 disestablishments in Denmark